Paul Komposch (born 13 May 2001) is an Austrian professional footballer who plays as a centre-back for Sturm Graz.

Career
Komposch is a youth product of FC Stattegg, and joined the Sturm Graz youth academy in 2011. He made his senior debut with Sturm Graz in a 8–0 Austrian Cup win over SV Innsbruck on 28 August 2020, coming on as a substitute in the 75th minute. He signed his first professional contract with Sturm Graz on 20 October 2020, keeping him at the club until June 2023.

References

External links
 
 OEFB Profile

2001 births
Living people
Austrian footballers
SK Sturm Graz players
Austrian Football Bundesliga players
Austrian Regionalliga players
Association football defenders